NURC may refer to:
 National Ultimate Running Championship, Norway
 NATO Undersea Research Centre, Italy
 National Undersea Research Center, USA
 National Underwater Robotics Challenge, USA
 National Unity and Reconciliation Commission, Rwanda
 National University Research Council, Romania